

Description
The Fungus-eating Ladybird (Illeis galbula) is  a species of beetle in the family Coccinellidae. Adults are 4-5mm in size, while the larvae are between 8 and 10mm. Adults are black with bright yellow markings. Larvae are grey with black tubercles covered with short spines. The pupa is pale yellow with black tubercles and lateral spurs.

Behaviour
During the day it is fast moving and readily flies or drops when disturbed. The pupa are active and often stand on end. 
Adult and larval fungus-eating ladybirds are often found in gardens where they eat powdery mildew on cucurbit crops like pumpkin and zucchini. In Australia, overwintering adults feed on pollen of wattles and privet species during spring.

Distribution
This species is native to Eastern Australia. Fungus-eating ladybirds are a non-native species in the North Island of New Zealand, first introduced to Auckland in 1985. They are also found in New Guinea.

Gallery

See also
Steelblue ladybird

References

Beetles of Australia
Beetles of New Zealand
Coccinellidae
Beetles described in 1850